Belovite-(Ce) is the cerium analogue of Belovite-(La). It is a member in the belovite group being a subgroup of the apatite group.

Belovite-(Ce) was first described in 1954 and named for Nikolai Belov. Its type locality is Malyi Punkaruaiv mountain in Lovozersky District, Russia.

References

Sodium minerals
Strontium minerals
Cerium minerals
Phosphate minerals
Trigonal minerals
Minerals in space group 147
Minerals described in 1953